Tiberiopolis (sometimes in sources, Tiberiapolis, and Pappa-Tiberiopolis; formerly Pappa) was a town in the Roman province of Phrygia Pacatiana, mentioned by Ptolemy, Socrates of Constantinople and Hierocles. At various times, it was considered as part of Phrygia, Isauria, and the late Roman province of Pisidia.

It struck its own coins at least from the time of Trajan.

It was situated at the modern village of Yunuslar, Beyşehir district, in Konya Province, Turkey. At Tiberiopolis the famous Roman sarcophagus showing the Twelve Labours of Hercules now displayed at the Konya Archaeological Museum was recovered.

It must have been Christianised at an early date. Nicephorus, a presbyter at Tiberiopolis was martyred in 361 or 362, and later canonized. His feast is celebrated on 28 November.

Bishopric

Tiberiopolis
The bishopric of Tiberiopolis appears in the oldest Greek Notitiae episcopatuum among the suffragans of Laodicea in Phrygia, capital and metropolitan see of the late Roman province of Phrygia Pacatiana, but in the 8th century it was attached to Hierapolis in Phrygia, capital and metropolitan see of Phrygia Pacatiana Secunda, and as such appears in the Notitiae episcopatuum of the Ecumenical Patriarchate of Constantinople until the 13th century, when the area was overrun by the Seljuk Turks.

Bishops

Le Quien mentions five of its bishops known by their presence at councils:

Eustathius at a synod in Constantinople (536);
Silas at the Second Council of Constantinople (553);
Anastasius at the Quinisext Council (692);
Michael at the Second Council of Nicaea (787);
Theoctistus at the Fourth Council of Constantinople (879).

Roman Catholic titular see

Tiberiopolis remains a titular see in the Roman Catholic Church. Titular bishops have been:

Thomas Williams, O.P. (1725–1740), Vicar Apostolic of the Northern District
John MacDonald (1761–1779), Vicar Apostolic of the Highland District
Istvan Gosztonyi (1815–1817)
Pablo García Abella, C.O. (1827–1833), Bishop of Calahorra y La Calzada
Gabriele Maria de Marchis (1834–1858)
Michael Flannery (1858–1859), Bishop of Killaloe
Pedro José Tordoya Montoya (1860–1875). Bishop of Cusco
Eusebio Marie Semprini, O.F.M. (1876–1893)
Mariano Antonio Espinosa (1893–1898), Archbishop of Buenos Aires
Antonio Scotti (1898–1919)
Adalbero Joseph (Michael) Fleischer, C.M.M. (1922–1963)
Adolfo Rodríguez Herrera (1963–1964), Archbishop of Camagüey

Pappa
Under the name of Pappa, the town was also a bishopric of the province of Pisidia, and later a titular see of the Roman Catholic Church.

Notes

References

Attribution
 The entry cites:
William Smith, Dictionary of Greek and Roman Geography, s.v.;
William Mitchell Ramsay, Asia Minor (London, 1890), 147, 458.

Ancient Greek cities in Anatolia
Catholic titular sees in Asia
Defunct dioceses of the Ecumenical Patriarchate of Constantinople
Roman towns and cities in Turkey
History of Konya Province
Populated places in Phrygia
Populated places in ancient Isauria
Populated places in Pisidia
Populated places of the Byzantine Empire